"The Pride You Hide" is a song by Roger Daltrey, who at the time was the former lead singer of The Who. The song was written by Alan Dalgleish, Nicky Tesco and Roger Daltrey. The track was included on Roger Daltrey's sixth solo album, Under a Raging Moon, as the fourth track on the first side of the LP. The album was a tribute to The Who's former drummer Keith Moon. 

Cash Box called it a "forlorn ballad [that] shows a slow side of Daltrey, though he cuts loose on the bridge."

The song was released as a single in 1985 on Atlantic Records but failed to chart.

The single was re-released as a limited edition double pack, which featured an unreleased B-side, and live tracks including a live cover of The Who's "Pictures of Lily" and a live version "Don't Talk to Strangers" from his album Under a Raging Moon.

References

1986 singles
1986 songs
Atlantic Records singles
Songs written by Roger Daltrey